This is an episode list for the adventure radio drama The Shadow.  The series, inspired by an announcer character on earlier anthology series, premiered on the Mutual Network on September 26, 1937 and ended on December 26, 1954.  The  677 episodes aired over 18 seasons, including an additional summer series in the first season.

The seasons were of variable length: Season 1 through Season 8 were of 26-30 episodes, Season 9 through Season 12 were of 38-39 episodes, Season 13 through Season 17 were of 47-52 episodes, and the final Season 18 was of 22 episodes.

There are a number of lost episodes, over 60% of the total: 153 episodes are missing, six episodes are incomplete from seasons one through 12 and seasons 13 through 18 are entirely missing except for three episodes.

Radio scripts are available for the series including the missing episodes, except for the season 1 summer series, which is complete in recordings. Some of the missing episodes are available in preserved recordings of a 1940s Australian adaptation and in recordings of recreated stage readings collected by old-time radio enthusiasts.

List of seasons

Season 1: (1937–1938)

Season 1B: (1938 summer series)

Season 2: (1938–1939)

Season 3: (1939–1940)

Season 4: (1940–1941)

Season 5: (1941–1942)

Season 6: (1942–1943)

Season 7: (1943–1944)

Season 8: (1944–1945)

Season 9: (1945–1946)

Season 10: (1946–1947)

Season 11: (1947–1948)

Season 12: (1948–1949)

Season 13: (1949–1950)

Season 14: (1950–1951)

Season 15: (1951–1952)

Season 16: (1952–1953)

Season 17: (1953–1954)

Season 18: (1954)

Notes
Radio Spirits, the company that officially releases episodes of The Shadow on CD, has been releasing their collections with various newly found episodes and titling them as "Lost Shows".

Among these episodes are the complete second summer season starring Orson Welles as The Shadow.  Eleven episodes were newly discovered that had not been heard since the original broadcasts:

The Old People 06-26-38,
The Voice of the Trumpet 07-03-38,
He Died at Twelve 07-10-38, 
The Reincarnation of Michael 07-17-38,
The Mark of the Bat 07-24-38,
Revenge on the Shadow 07-31-38,
The Mine Hunters 08-07-38,
The Hospital Murders 08-14-38,
The Black Buddha 09-04-38, 
The Witch Drums 09-11-38,
Professor X 09-18-38

On the latest collection "Crime Does Not Pay", two more lost shows starring Bill Johnstone are included:

Fountain of Death 11-27-38,
Murder by Rescue 12-11-38

The list on this page does not include episode "The Case of the River of Eternal Woe", which was scheduled to air 04-15-1948, but was preempted due to news coverage of the death of President Roosevelt.  The episode never aired and the recording is lost but a script survives.

References
 
 
 

Shadow
Episodes